Robert Löfman (22 July 1875 – 8 January 1940) was a Swedish sports shooter. He competed in three events at the 1912 Summer Olympics.

References

1875 births
1940 deaths
Swedish male sport shooters
Olympic shooters of Sweden
Shooters at the 1912 Summer Olympics
Sport shooters from Stockholm
20th-century Swedish people